Frīdrihs, or Fridrihs, is a Latvian masculine given name. It is a cognate of the names Friedrich and  Frederick. A diminutive form of Frīdrihs is Fricis. Individuals bearing the name Frīdrihs include:

Jānis Frīdrihs Baumanis (1834–1891), Latvian architect
Fridrihs Bošs (1887–1950), Latvian cyclist
Frīdrihs Briedis (1888–1918), Latvian-Russian Empire Army colonel
Frīdrihs Canders (also known as Friedrich Zander, 1887–1933), Baltic German pioneer of rocketry and spaceflight
Fridrihs Ukstiņš (1895–19??), Latvian cyclist
Frīdrihs Vesmanis (1875–1941), Latvian lawyer and politician

References

Latvian masculine given names